Kalithozhan is a 1966 Indian Malayalam film,  directed by M. Krishnan Nair and produced by A. V. Subbarao and L.V Prasad. The film stars Prem Nazir, Sheela, Sukumari and Adoor Bhasi in the lead roles. The film had musical score by G. Devarajan. The film was a remake of the Telugu film Illarikam.

Cast

Prem Nazir as Venu
Sheela as Radha
Sukumari as Mridula
Adoor Bhasi as Unnithan
T. S. Muthaiah as Sankara Pilla
Bahadoor as Shivan
G. K. Pillai as Raghavan Karthavu
Philomina as Ponnamma
Premalatha as Ammayi
Kottayam Shantha as Kalyaniyamma
Sumathi as Seetha 
T. K. Balachandran as Raghu

Soundtrack
The music was composed by G. Devarajan and the lyrics were written by P. Bhaskaran.

References

External links
 

1966 films
1960s Malayalam-language films
Malayalam remakes of Telugu films
Films directed by M. Krishnan Nair